William H. Coombs (sometimes misreported as Combs; July 17, 1808 – November 28, 1894) was a justice of the Indiana Supreme Court from December 2, 1882, to January 1, 1883.

Born in Brunswick, Maine to Andrew and Susanah Coombs, Coombs attended the public schools of Cincinnati, Ohio. In December, 1811, his family moved to Cincinnati and the following spring they located on a farm twenty miles east of that city, in Clermont County, Ohio, where Coombs spent his youth. He went to Cincinnati in 1826, working as a carpenter until 1831. In 1831, he settled in Connersville, Indiana, where he read law with Caleb B. Smith. He was admitted to the bar at Connorsville in the spring of 1834, and for a short time practiced with Smith.

He practiced law in Wabash from 1835 to 1847, then in Fort Wayne from 1847 to 1840, when he set out for California via Cape Horn. He practiced law and had a farm in California until 1855, when he returned to Fort Wayne. He retired from the practice of law in 1866, but on December 2, 1882, Governor Albert G. Porter appointed Coombs to a seat on the supreme court vacated by the resignation of James Worden. Coombs remained on the court for only one month, until his successor was qualified on January 1, 1883.

Coombs married Jane Adsall of Ohio on May 25, 1837, with whom he had 11 children, only three of whom survived him. Coombs died in his home, following several months of declining health.

References

1808 births
1894 deaths
People from Brunswick, Maine
U.S. state supreme court judges admitted to the practice of law by reading law
Justices of the Indiana Supreme Court
19th-century American judges